Ernest Victor Carter (October 13, 1860 – January 3, 1933) was an American politician who served in the Oregon House of Representatives. He was chosen as Speaker of that body from 1898 to 1901. He was the son of Henry B. Carter, a businessman and banker from Iowa and former member of the Iowa State Senate and namesake of the Carter House in Ashland, Oregon which is listed on the National Register of Historic Places.

References

Speakers of the Oregon House of Representatives
1933 deaths
1860 births
Republican Party members of the Oregon House of Representatives
Politicians from Ashland, Oregon
Businesspeople from Oregon
American bankers
People from Clayton County, Iowa